The World Is Yours is a 2018 French crime comedy film co-written and directed by Romain Gavras. It stars Karim Leklou, Isabelle Adjani, Vincent Cassel, Oulaya Amamra, François Damiens and Philippe Katerine. It was selected to screen at the Directors' Fortnight section of the 2018 Cannes Film Festival.

The leitmotif is Daniel Balavoine's song "La vie ne m'apprend rien".

Synopsis
François, a small-time drug dealer, dreams of starting a new life as the official distributor of Mr. Freeze ice pops in the Maghreb region. However, he discovers that his mother Dany has lost all his savings gambling. He then tries to start anew by associating with Poutine, the erratic kingpin of the city, for a scheme in Spain. But François's entourage gets involved, which soon disrupts everyone's plans.

Cast
 Karim Leklou as François
 Isabelle Adjani as Dany
 Vincent Cassel as Henri
 Oulaya Amamra as Lamya
 Sam Spruell as Bruce
 Gabby Rose as Britanny
 Sofian Khammes as Poutine
 Mounir Amamra as Mohamed 1
 Mahamadou Sangare as Mohamed 2
 François Damiens as René
 Philippe Katerine as Vincent

Production
The project was announced on 25 April 2017 by Isabelle Adjani in an interview with Grazia magazine. The actress described it as "pretty crazy" and revealed that Vincent Cassel and Oulaya Amamra would also be involved.

Reception

Critical response
On French website Allociné, the film has a critic approval rating of 3.6/5 based on 34 reviews and a viewer approval rating of 3.5/5. Théo Ribeton of French magazine Les Inrockuptibles praised the humour and confidence of director Romain Gavras, comparing the film to Guy Ritchie's early work. In a less enthusiastic review, Corentin Lê of CinéSéries called the plot line "predictable."

Peter Debruge of Variety called the film a "crowd-pleasing Tarantino-esque crime saga." Phil Hoad of The Guardian review wrote that with this film "Gavras has seized his chance, staging this uptempo, carnivalesque crime pic with panache and wit." David Ehrlich of IndieWire called the film "the best movie that Guy Ritchie never made."

Award nominations
 César Awards:
Best Supporting Actress for Isabelle Adjani
Most Promising Actor for Karim Leklou

References

External links
 

2018 films
2018 comedy films
2018 crime films
2010s crime comedy films
2010s French-language films
2010s heist films
Films about the illegal drug trade
French crime comedy films
French heist films
StudioCanal films
2010s French films